Musser is a surname. Notable people with the surname include:

A. Milton Musser (1830–1909), Mormon pioneer
Alec Musser (born 1973), American fitness model and actor
Andy Musser (1937–2012), American sportscaster
Charles Musser (born 1951), American film scholar
Clair Omar Musser (1901–1998), American marimba virtuoso, designer, and composer
Danny Musser (1905–2000), American professional baseball player
David Musser (contemporary), American computer scientist
Frank Musser, American politician
George Musser (born 1965), American science writer
Guy Musser (born 1936), American zoologist
Joseph White Musser (1872–1954), Mormon fundamentalist leader
Josephine Musser, former political candidate in Wisconsin
Neal Musser (born 1980), American professional baseball player
Paul Musser (1889–1973), American professional baseball player
Pete Musser (1928-2019), American businessman
Rebecca Musser, wife of Rulon Jeffs and escapee from the FLDS
Terry Musser (1947-2018), American politician
Tharon Musser (1925–2009), American Broadway lighting designer
Walton Musser (1909–1998), inventor of strain wave gearing and 250 inventions/discoveries

See also

Moussier